Bishnupur High School is one of the oldest higher secondary schools of Bankura district. It is situated at Dalmadal para, Bishnupur College Road in Bishnupur, Bankura, in the Indian state of West Bengal.

History
The school was established in 1879 by the British Government. In the colonial era it was an English Medium school only for boys but now Bishnupur High School is a Co-Education school in the Higher Secondary section. Initially, it was named Bishenpur High School according to the European pronunciation of Bengali term. This school is affiliated to West Bengal Board of Secondary Education for Madhyamik and to West Bengal Council of Higher Secondary Education for Higher Secondary.

Notable Persons
Maniklal Sinha
Chattaranjan Dasgupta
and many more.

See also
Education in India
List of schools in India
Education in West Bengal

References

External links 

Schools in Bankura district
Educational institutions established in 1879
Schools in Colonial India
High schools and secondary schools in West Bengal
1879 establishments in British India